Cazoulès is a former commune in the Dordogne department in Nouvelle-Aquitaine in southwestern France. On 1 January 2022, it was merged into the new commune of Pechs-de-l'Espérance.

Population

See also
Communes of the Dordogne department

References

Former communes of Dordogne